Wobble or wobbles may refer to:

 "Wobble" (song), a single by V.I.C.
 Wobbles (equine disorder), a disorder of the nervous system in dogs and horses
 Wobble base pair, a type of base pairing in genetics
 Chandler wobble, short-term periodic change in Earth's axial tilt
 Jah Wobble (born 1958), British musician
 Milankovitch wobble, long-term change in the Earth's axial tilt, axial precession and orbital eccentricity
 Speed wobble, a quick oscillation of primarily just the steerable wheel(s) of a vehicle
 A metasyntactic variable, commonly used alongside wibble, wubble, and flob

See also
 Wobbler (disambiguation)
 Weeble, several lines of children's roly-poly toys
 Doppler spectroscopy in astronomy, also known as the wobble method